Hypolycaena erasmus is a butterfly in the family Lycaenidae. It was described by Henley Grose-Smith in 1900. It is found on the Bismarck Archipelago and Halmahera.

References

Butterflies described in 1900
Hypolycaenini
Taxa named by Henley Grose-Smith